Daryl Arnold (November 12, 1924December 30, 1997) was a farmer, businessman and diplomat. He served as the 8th United States Ambassador to Singapore from 1987 to 1989.

Career
Prior to his diplomatic career Arnold served as president of the Western Growers Association one of the largest agricultural trade associations in the United States.

Death
Ambassador Arnold and his wife Shirley were driving to Palm Springs, California to celebrate her 73rd birthday. On the way, their Cadillac veered off the highway and crashed into a signpost killing them both. Arnold and his wife had been married for 51 years and lived in Corona del Mar, California.

References

1924 births
1997 deaths
Ambassadors of the United States to Singapore
University of Southern California alumni